This is a list of universities in East Timor.

Dili Institute of Technology
National University of East Timor
Universidade Da Paz
Universidade Dili
Instituto Profissional de Canossa (IPDC)

Universities
East Timor
East Timor